The 1926 Baylor Bears football team represented Baylor University in the Southwest Conference (SWC) during the 1926 college football season. In their first season under head coach Morley Jennings, the Bears compiled a 6–3–1 record (3–1–1 against conference opponents), finished in second place in the conference, and outscored opponents by a combined total of 103 to 93. They played their home games at Cotton Palace in Waco, Texas. George Morris was the team captain.

Schedule

References

Baylor
Baylor Bears football seasons
Baylor Bears football